Players who neither have high enough rankings nor receive wild cards may participate in a qualifying tournament held one week before the annual Wimbledon Tennis Championships.

This is the first time the Wimbledon women's singles event will have 16 qualifiers, following the example set by the US Open. Wimbledon previously had 12 qualifiers in the women's draw.

Cori Gauff became the youngest qualifier to reach the main draw at Wimbledon in the Open Era at 15 years and 122 days old.

Seeds

Qualifiers

Lucky losers

Qualifying draw

First qualifier

Second qualifier

Third qualifier

Fourth qualifier

Fifth qualifier

Sixth qualifier

Seventh qualifier

Eighth qualifier

Ninth qualifier

Tenth qualifier

Eleventh qualifier

Twelfth qualifier

Thirteenth qualifier

Fourteenth qualifier

Fifteenth qualifier

Sixteenth qualifier

References

External links
 Ladies' Singles Qualifying draw
2019 Wimbledon Championships – Women's draws and results at the International Tennis Federation

Women's Singles Qualifying
Wimbledon Championship by year – Women's singles qualifying
Wimbledon Championships